Polylepis neglecta is a species of plant in the family Rosaceae. It is endemic to Bolivia.  It is threatened by habitat loss.

References

neglecta
Endemic flora of Bolivia
Flora of the Andes
Páramo flora
Vulnerable plants
Taxonomy articles created by Polbot